Reed Arts Week (RAW) is a celebration of the arts at Reed College, a liberal arts institution in Portland, Oregon, in the United States. It includes music, dance, theater, films, creative writing and the visual arts. In addition to student performances, major artists perform original works and participate in master class work with members of the Reed College community. Visiting artists have included Karen Finley (2001), The Yes Men (2003), Tao Lin (2009), Chris Kraus (2012), and Antoine Catala (2014). RAW was conceived by professors David Schiff and Maeera Schreiber in 1990 as a weekend that would highlight the visual and performing arts at the college. It originally began as a weekend, but soon grew into a weeklong annual festival celebrated in February or March.

RAW has been student-run since its inception by Schiff and Schreiber. Each year, RAW Student Coordinators are responsible for appointing students to other RAW positions, such as those in public relations and graphic design. Until 2003, the appointment of RAW Student Coordinators and the funding of RAW fell into the domain of the student body and its senate. Following a 2001 controversy in which an anonymous Title IX complaint was filed against the college after a purportedly pornographic performance piece, Reed community members, the student senate, and the administration engaged in a discussion about student management of RAW in spring of 2001. The Title IX complaint alleged that the piece constituted sexual harassment and lacked artistic merit. The 2001 discussion revealed that several community members supported the claim that it lacked artistic merit and demonstrated indecency, and senate discussed the possibility that RAW would be placed under administrative control, such that the administration would "elect student coordinators and manage RAW funds."

In 2003, the Reed College administration announced that the RAW coordinator appointment process would be conducted by Reed's Student Services.

References

1990 establishments in Oregon
Annual events in Portland, Oregon
Arts festivals in the United States
Culture of Portland, Oregon
Reed College